Sheila McLaughlin (born 1950) is an American lesbian feminist director, producer, screenwriter, actor, and photographer. She wrote and directed the controversial film, She Must Be Seeing Things (1987). Her debut feature film, Committed (1984), which she co-directed with writer Lynne Tillman, is an experimental narrative of the life of Frances Farmer, shot on a low budget of $45,000. McLaughlin's films have been described as presenting "a grasp of a developing new feminist language of cinema."

McLaughlin left filmmaking to practice acupuncture.

Filmography

See also
 List of female film and television directors
 List of lesbian filmmakers
 List of LGBT-related films directed by women

References

External links
 
  Committed at First Run Features

1950 births
Living people
American experimental filmmakers
American feminists
American film actresses
American photographers
American women film directors
American women film producers
Lesbian feminists
LGBT film directors
LGBT producers
Women experimental filmmakers
Film directors from New York City
Film producers from New York (state)
Screenwriters from New York (state)
American LGBT writers
Acupuncturists
American women screenwriters
21st-century American women